Blake Raymond Pelly,  (31 May 1907 – 16 October 1990) was an Australian air force officer, politician and businessman, who represented the Liberal Party in New South Wales Parliament.

Before and during the Second World War Pelly served in the Royal Australian Air Force, rising to the rank of group captain and serving as director of Operations Royal Australian Air Force Headquarters 1945–1946. He was mentioned in despatches on 24 September 1941 and, on 16 June 1944, was appointed an Officer of the Order of the British Empire for distinguished service and efficiency in the south-west Pacific area.

Pelly represented the electoral district of Wollondilly from 1950 to 1957.

After retiring Pelly was chairman of directors of Rio Tinto (Australia) Limited, Hammersley Iron Pty Limited, Zinc Corporation Limited, Merchant Bills Corporation; chairman of directors of Unity Life Assurance Limited from 1959, Sun Alliance Insurance Limited from 1972, deputy chairman of Universities Board in 1967, and a member of Higher Education Board in 1976.

References

1907 births
1990 deaths
Australian aviators
Royal Australian Air Force personnel of World War II
Liberal Party of Australia members of the Parliament of New South Wales
Members of the New South Wales Legislative Assembly
Officers of the Order of the British Empire
Royal Australian Air Force officers
20th-century Australian politicians
People from Buckley, Flintshire